Daira is a genus of crabs and is the only genus in the family Dairidae.

The genus has almost cosmopolitan distribution.

Species:

Daira americana 
Daira coronata 
Daira depressa 
Daira eocaenica 
Daira eocenica 
Daira gabertii 
Daira perlata 
Daira salebrosa 
Daira sicula 
Daira speciosa 
Daira vulgaris

References

Crabs
Decapod genera